The South Africa women's national squash team represents South Africa in international squash team competitions, and is governed by Squash South Africa.

Since 1992, South Africa has participated in two Semi finals of the World Squash Team Open.

Current team
 Siyoli Waters
 Cheyna Tucker
 Milnay Louw
 Alexandra Fuller

Results

World Team Squash Championships

See also 
 Squash South Africa
 World Team Squash Championships
 South Africa men's national squash team

References 

Women's national squash teams
Squash